Kelsey Neumann (born May 7, 1991) is an American professional ice hockey goaltender for the Buffalo Beauts of the National Women's Hockey League (NWHL).

Career 
Neumann briefly played collegiate women's ice hockey for Clarkson University and SUNY Plattsburgh in the NCAA. Prior to playing college hockey, Neumann played for the North American Hockey Academy for three years. She played in 150 games totaling 6630 minutes. Over her three years at NAHA, she achieved a career GAA of 1.16, a save percentage of .930, and amassed 54 shutouts, and holds the program record for shut-outs in a season. Was also in net for two Assabet Tournament championships, two JWHL championships, and two Cornwall Typhoon tournament championships. Prior to NAHA, she was a member of the Madison Capitals Bantam AAA boys’ team that participated at Nationals.

Prior to joining the Buffalo Beauts, Neumann played for the USA Hockey National Bound, North Carolina Women's hockey team, winning 1 National title and 1 second place title. She finished in the top 5 goalies 4 of the 5 years the team played.

Professional 
Neumann joined the practice squad for the Buffalo Beauts in the 2016/17 NWHL season. Neumann was the Buffalo Beauts recipient for the 2017 NWHL Foundation Award.

In June 2017, it was announced that she had signed a one-year contract to play for the Buffalo Beauts in the 2017/18 NWHL season.

Neumann has returned to the Buffalo Beauts for the 2019-2020 season after a one year hiatus.

Personal life  
Daughter of Cindi and Tracy Neumann. She was a member of the National Honor Society at the North American Hockey Academy. BA in Communications, MS in Special Education and Elementary Education. Member of Alpha Sigma Nu Honor Society from Canisius College. Her older brother is currently serving as an Officer in the Army. Lists Vladislav Tretiak as her favorite athlete.

References

External links
 
 High School Statistics and player information from Clarkson University

1991 births
American women's ice hockey goaltenders
Buffalo Beauts players
Living people
Clarkson Golden Knights women's ice hockey players
State University of New York at Plattsburgh alumni
Ice hockey people from North Carolina
People from China Grove, North Carolina